is a Japanese footballer currently playing as a defender for YSCC Yokohama.

Career statistics

Club
.

Notes

References

External links

1997 births
Living people
Association football people from Tokyo
Japanese footballers
Association football defenders
J3 League players
YSCC Yokohama players